Jinghai Town is a township-level division and the county seat of Jinghai District, Tianjin, China.

References

Towns in Tianjin